John Hamer is the name of:

John Hamer (figure skater) (born 1982), English figure skater
John Hamer (footballer) (born 1944), English footballer
John C. Hamer (born 1970), American-Canadian historian and mapmaker